Liu Wenzhe (October 7, 1940 – September 20, 2011) was an  International Master chess player. He was one of China's top chess trainers.

Liu Wenzhe played for Guangdong chess club in the China Chess League (CCL).

Chess career 

He was the first Chinese player to defeat a grandmaster (Nikolai Krogius in 1965) and the first to be awarded the title of International Master. He is considered a pioneer of chess in China and a founding father of the Chinese School of Chess. He won the Chinese Chess Championship in 1980 and 1982.

Two years after the end of the Cultural Revolution and Mao Zedong's death and the fall of the Gang of Four in 1976, China competed in their first Olympiad in Buenos Aires. It was there that Liu Wenzhe defeated grandmaster Jan Hein Donner of the Netherlands in crushing style after only 20 moves. It remains his best known game:
Liu Wenzhe—Donner, Buenos Aires Olympiad, 1978. Pirc Defence (ECO B07)1.e4 d6 2.d4 Nf6 3.Nc3 g6 4.Be2 Bg7 5.g4 h6 6.h3 c5 7.d5 O-O? 8.h4 e6 9.g5 hxg5 10.hxg5 Ne8 11.Qd3 exd5 12.Nxd5 Nc6 13.Qg3 Be6 14.Qh4 f5 15.Qh7+ Kf7 (diagram) 16.Qxg6+! Kxg6 17.Bh5+ Kh7 18.Bf7+ Bh6 19.g6+ Kg7 20.Bxh6+ 1-0

In total, Liu made three appearances at the Chess Olympiads (1978–1982) with an overall record of 37 games played (+14, =4, -19). He also made four appearances in total at the Men's Asian Team Chess Championship (1979–1981, 1991–1993) with an overall record of 17 games played (+10, =4, -3).

In 1986 he was appointed to the post of Chief Trainer of the Chinese Institute of Chess and head coach of the Chinese national chess team. He was succeeded by Ye Jiangchuan in 2000.

In 2002-3, he wrote a seminal book on the "Chinese School of Chess" called the same name (see Further reading). In the book he charts the dramatic progress of Chinese players over the past 25 years.

Quotes
"Systematically training players is more important than selecting them."—Liu Wenzhe, head coach, women's Chinese Olympic team.

See also
Chess in China

References

Further reading

Bill Kelleher. "From I Ching to Zhu Chen". ChessCafe.com Book Review of Chinese School of Chess (2003) by Liu Wenzhe.

External links

Chessmetrics Career Ratings for Liu Wenzhe

1940 births
2011 deaths
Chess International Masters
Chess coaches
Chess players from Harbin